Sylvain Jean Lefebvre (born October 14, 1967) is a Canadian former ice hockey defenceman who played on five National Hockey League teams from 1989 to 2003. He won the Stanley Cup with the Colorado Avalanche in 1996. Lefebvre was most recently an assistant coach for the Columbus Blue Jackets.

Playing career
Sylvain Lefebvre signed with the Montreal Canadiens in 1986 and made the team's roster in 1989–90 as an undrafted free agent. He played three seasons with the Habs before being traded to the Toronto Maple Leafs in exchange for a third round draft pick prior to the start of the 1992–93 season. Lefebvre played two seasons with the Leafs before being traded to the Quebec Nordiques as part of the Wendel Clark-Mats Sundin trade on June 28, 1994. Lefebvre played the next five seasons with the Quebec Nordiques/Colorado Avalanche before signing a four-year, $10-million US contract with the New York Rangers that secured a club-option for him to play a fifth season at $3 million in the 1999 off-season. Lefebvre's productivity decreased after several injuries, including a shattered index finger which occurred while blocking a shot. The doctor compared the injury to taking a hammer and hitting his finger until the bone is shattered into little pieces. Lefebvre's career low came in the 2002–03 season. After four years with the Rangers, Lefebvre left the NHL and decided to join old friend Sebastien Bordeleau for one season to play for the Swiss team SC Bern where he and his team won the cup. He retired shortly thereafter.

After winning the Stanley Cup with the Colorado Avalanche in 1996, Lefebvre was involved in an incident that attracted media attention. As part of tradition, each player on the Stanley Cup winning team can take personal possession of the trophy for a day during the summer following the championship, a practice that has led to several misadventures. When it was his turn, Lefebvre decided to have his daughter baptized in it.

Retirement and coaching career
Lefebvre was named as assistant coach of the American Hockey League's Lake Erie Monsters.  On June 4, 2009, the Colorado Avalanche announced that Lefebvre would serve as an assistant coach.

On June 13, 2012, Sylvain Lefebvre became the head coach of the Hamilton Bulldogs of the American Hockey League, the Montreal Canadiens' affiliate. The Canadiens purchased and relocated the Bulldogs to become the second iteration of the St. John's IceCaps in 2015, keeping Lefebvre as head coach of their affiliate. In 2017, the Canadiens' AHL franchise was again relocated, becoming the Laval Rocket, taking Lefebvre with the team. After one season in Laval and finishing with the worst record in the AHL during the 2017–18 season, Lefebvre was released immediately upon the conclusion of the season. Lefebvre then spent three seasons with the AHL's San Diego Gulls as an assistant. In June 2021, Lefebvre was announced as an assistant coach in the NHL with the Columbus Blue Jackets, but was replaced on September 13, 2021, due to his decision not to get a COVID-19 vaccine.

Career statistics

Regular season and playoffs

References

External links
 

1967 births
Living people
Canadian expatriate ice hockey players in Switzerland
Canadian ice hockey coaches
Canadian ice hockey defencemen
Colorado Avalanche coaches
Colorado Avalanche players
French Quebecers
Hartford Wolf Pack players
Ice hockey people from Quebec
Laval Rocket coaches
Laval Titan players
Laval Voisins players
Montreal Canadiens players
New York Rangers players
People from Estrie
Quebec Nordiques players
SC Bern players
Sherbrooke Canadiens players
Stanley Cup champions
St. John's IceCaps coaches
Toronto Maple Leafs players
Undrafted National Hockey League players